The 2011 season is the 87th season of competitive football in Fiji.

National teams 

The home team or the team that is designated as the home team is listed in the left column the away team is in the right column.

Senior

Friendly matches

2011 Pacific Games

Under-20

2011 OFC U-20 Championship

Under-17

2011 OFC U-17 Championship

National Football League

Table

Fijian clubs in international competitions

Lautoka F.C.

Ba F.C.

References
 Fiji tables at Soccerway
 Fijian national team at Soccerway

Seasons in Fijian football
football
Fijian
Fijian